Safia Grace Oakley-Green (born June 2001) is an English actress. She won a British Independent Film Award for her performance as Beyah in the horror film The Origin (2022).

Early life
Oakley-Green was born in Southwark, London. She trained at the Television Workshop in Nottingham.

Career
In 2021, she appeared in the lesbian horror short film Requiem alongside fellow Television Workshop alumnus Bella Ramsey. The short picked up increased attention from after Ramsey’s performance in the HBO television series The Last of Us raised her profile.

Oakley-Green made her feature film debut in the 2021 biopic The Colour Room for Sky Cinema alongside Phoebe Dynevor. She made her television debut as Cinderella Jackson in the 2022 BBC One crime drama Sherwood. Also in 2022, she starred in the Scottish caveman horror The Origin, for which she received the British Independent Film Award for Breakthrough Performance in December 2022.

In 2023, Oakley-Green had a recurring role as Andy in the Disney+ comedy Extraordinary. She has upcoming roles in the second series of The Lazarus Project on Sky Max and the Paramount+ series The Burning Girls.

Filmography

Film

Television

References

External links
 

People from the London Borough of Southwark
2001 births
Living people
21st-century British actors
21st-century English actors
Actors from Nottingham
Actors from Nottinghamshire
British film actors
British television actors